The HTC Jetstream is a 10.1 inch tablet from Taiwanese company HTC, which was earlier rumored as the HTC Puccini. It is also the first 4G LTE tablet from AT&T.

HTC Jetstream has a 1.5 GHz dual core processor and an 8MP camera.

References 

HTC Corporation
Android (operating system) devices
Tablet computers
Tablet computers introduced in 2011